Rana Aylin Foroohar (née Dogar; born March 4, 1970) is an American author, business columnist and an associate editor at the Financial Times. She is also CNN's global economic analyst.

Life and career 
Foroohar was born Rana Aylin Dogar in Frankfort, Indiana, graduating from Frankfort Senior High School in 1988. Her father Aygen Erol Dogar is a Turkish immigrant and an engineer who started a small manufacturing business in the Midwest. Her mother Ann was a school teacher, and herself the daughter of immigrants from Sweden and England. In 1992, Foroohar graduated from Barnard College with a B.A. in English literature.

Foroohar spent thirteen years at Newsweek, as an economics and foreign affairs editor and as a London-based correspondent covering Europe and the Middle East. During that time, she was awarded the German Marshall Fund's Peter Weitz Prize for transatlantic reporting. She has also received awards and fellowships from institutions such as the Paul H. Nitze School of Advanced International Studies at Johns Hopkins University and the East–West Center.

Foroohar then spent six years at Time magazine, as an assistant editor and economic columnist. Her articles included a 2013 cover story entitled "The Myth of Financial Reform", which was criticized by the U.S. Department of the Treasury.

In 2016, she published her first book, Makers and Takers: The Rise of Finance and the Fall of American Business. The book was shortlisted for the 2016 Financial Times and McKinsey Business Book of the Year Award.

She joined the Financial Times as a columnist and associate editor in March 2017.

In November 2019, Foroohar published her second book Don't Be Evil: How Big Tech Betrayed Its Founding Principles—and All of Us. Her third book, Homecoming: The Path to Prosperity in a Post-Global World, was published in October 2022.

Her work has appeared in The New York Review of Books. She has also been interviewed on National Public Radio.

Personal life 
Foroohar's first husband was Kambiz Foroohar, an Iranian-British journalist for Bloomberg. 

She lives in Brooklyn with her husband, writer John Sedgwick, and her two children, Alex and Darya. She wrote about her father-in-law, Robert Minturn Sedgwick, an investment professional who warned about the disadvantages of actively managed funds, in Makers and Takers.

Books

See also
Everything bubble, Foroohar predicted its bursting in 2022

References

External links
 
 CNN appearances 
 FT articles
 Time magazine articles
 
 

1970 births
American business and financial journalists
21st-century American non-fiction writers
21st-century American women writers
American people of English descent
American people of Swedish descent
American people of Turkish descent
American women columnists
American women journalists
Barnard College alumni
CNN people
Financial Times people
Living people
People from Frankfort, Indiana
Sedgwick family
Time (magazine) people
Writers from Indiana